El Hadji Moutarou Baldé (born 5 October 1993) is a Senegalese footballer who plays as a right-back for Teungueth and the Senegal national team.

International career
Baldé made his debut with the Senegal national team in a 1–0 2020 African Nations Championship qualification loss to Liberia on 28 July 2019. He was named to the team of the tournament at the 2019 WAFU Cup of Nations.

References

External links
 
 

1997 births
Living people
People from Tambacounda Region
Senegalese footballers
Senegal international footballers
Association football fullbacks
ASEC Ndiambour players
Port Autonome players
AS Douanes (Senegal) players
Senegal Premier League players
2022 African Nations Championship players
Senegal A' international footballers